Melton and Belvoir Rural District was a rural district of Leicestershire, England, from 1935 to 1974.

It was formed in 1935 from the merger of the Melton Mowbray Rural District and the Belvoir Rural District, with part going to Melton Mowbray urban district also.

In 1974, under the Local Government Act 1972 the district merged with the Melton urban district to form the new non-metropolitan district of Melton.

History of Leicestershire
Districts of England abolished by the Local Government Act 1972